Karokia is a genus of spur-throated grasshoppers in the family Acrididae. There are at least 2 described species in Karokia.

Species
 Karokia blanci (Rehn, 1964)
 Karokia memorialis Gurney & Buxton, 1968

References

 Capinera J.L, Scott R.D., Walker T.J. (2004). Field Guide to Grasshoppers, Katydids, and Crickets of the United States. Cornell University Press.
 Otte, Daniel (1995). "Grasshoppers [Acridomorpha] C". Orthoptera Species File 4, 518.

Further reading

 

Melanoplinae